Peruri 88 is an under construction skyscraper at Kebayoran Baru, Jakarta, Indonesia. It is a mixed use development which was  expected to be completed by 2020. The skyscraper will house hotel, offices, and residential apartments. Once completed it will be one of the tallest buildings not only in Jakarta but also  within Southeast Asia.

Design and facilities
The building would comprise four staggered towers, which would rise up from a commercial podium at the base. The building will house retail, offices, housing, a luxury hotel, four levels of parking, a wedding house, a mosque, movie theaters, and an outdoor amphitheater accessed by outdoor elevators. Commercial podium will be located from levels B2 to the 7th floor.  Hotel will be located from the 44th floor to the 86th floor. A panoramic restaurant and viewing platform  will complete the structure at the 88th floor. The building will be integrated with  North-South line of Jakarta MRT at basement level. 
Update: This building cancelled to construction and design only.

See also

List of tallest buildings in Indonesia
 List of tallest buildings in Jakarta
List of tallest buildings in Southeast Asia
List of tallest buildings in Asia
List of tallest buildings in the world

References

Buildings and structures in Jakarta
Towers in Indonesia
Skyscrapers in Indonesia
Post-independence architecture of Indonesia
Skyscraper office buildings in Indonesia
Residential skyscrapers in Indonesia
Skyscraper hotels